Tobias 'Toby' Box (born 9 September 1972) is a male former athlete who competed for Great Britain & England.

Athletics career
Box represented England in the 200 metres and won a bronze medal in the 4 x 100 metres event, at the 1994 Commonwealth Games in Victoria, British Columbia, Canada.

Post athletic career
After retiring from athletics prematurely in 1998 due to injury, Toby Box worked in property.  He qualified as a Chartered Surveyor (MRICS) in 2012 and now works as a Development Surveyor in Kent, England.

External references
Toby Box's Athlete profile

References

1972 births
Living people
English male sprinters
Commonwealth Games medallists in athletics
Commonwealth Games bronze medallists for England
Athletes (track and field) at the 1994 Commonwealth Games
Universiade medalists in athletics (track and field)
Universiade silver medalists for Great Britain
Medallists at the 1994 Commonwealth Games